John Tinker may refer to:

 Joe Tinker (politician) (John Joseph Tinker, 1875–1957), British Labour Party Member of Parliament for Leigh 1923–1945
 John Tinker (colonial administrator)  (1700–1758), governor of the Bahamas 1741–1758
 John Tinker, lead plaintiff in Tinker v. Des Moines Independent Community School District, a U.S. Supreme Court case on student freedom of speech
 John Tinker (TV producer) (born 1958), American television producer/writer
 John Tinker (Royal Navy officer) (c. 1725–1767)